SC Kouroucien is a French Guiana football club.

References

External links 
 Soccerway profile

Kouroucien